The Multi-Role Ocean Surveillance Ship (MROSS) is a type of research and surveillance ship currently in development for the United Kingdom's Royal Fleet Auxiliary. Two ships are currently planned with them both being used by the RFA to research and protect critical undersea national infrastructure, such as undersea cables and gas pipelines, in both British and international waters.

Background
With around 380 in use across the world, undersea cables play a key role in the global economy by carrying trillions of dollars worth in financial transfers and transmitting 97% of the world's global communications. The UK, like most countries, is heavily reliant on undersea cables for its telecommunications and so considers them part of its critical national infrastructure. Due to their importance, they represent a potential high value target of hostile state interference and sabotage. In 2015, the Russian Navy commissioned Yantar, a research vessel which has since been sighted in the vicinity of undersea cables with an alleged capability to tamper with them. In December 2017, UK Chief of Defence Staff Sir Stuart Peach warned that Russia's modernised navy and increased submarine activity in the Atlantic could pose a significant threat to the UK's undersea cables. He warned that Russia could strike a "catastrophic" blow to the country's economy by cutting, disrupting or wire-tapping its undersea cables.

In 2021, the British government published the Integrated Review, a foreign, defence, security and international development policy review, which declared that the ocean was facing pressures caused by climate change and environment degradation, as well as growing tensions around maritime choke points, migration and piracy. This, it stated, negatively impacted livelihoods around the world and impacted the ocean's biological and mineral resources.

MROSS will not be the first vessels used by the Naval Service for research and surveillance. The Royal Navy's Hydrographic Squadron currently consists of five ships: subsea support vessel , inshore and coastal survey vessel , ocean survey vessel  and two Echo-class survey ships. In the past, the Royal Navy also operated , a specialist diving vessel commissioned in 1983, which took part in clandestine deep diving operations at the end of the Cold War. When she decommissioned in 1990, she left a capability gap which may be filled by MROSS.

Development
The Multi-Role Ocean Surveillance Ship programme was first publicly announced as part of the Integrated Review, a foreign, defence, security and international development policy review published by the British government in March 2021. The review stated that a singular ship would be procured to help deliver a government commitment to protecting the UK's critical national infrastructure and help further its knowledge of the maritime environment. It was also a part of a 30-year National Shipbuilding Strategy and likely to be built in Scotland.

By October 2021, the first ship had entered the concept and assessment phase. In October 2022, amid suspected Russian sabotage of the Nord Stream pipeline, British Defence Secretary Ben Wallace announced that two MROSS ships would be procured. The first ship is to be procured as a ready-built commercial vessel and converted, ready for service in 2023. The second vessel will be purpose-built in the UK. In November 2022, the Ministry of Defence announced that the programme would be accelerated using funds gained through the cancellation of the National Flagship, a vessel which was to be used by the monarch and government officials to promote UK interests abroad. The MOD also confirmed that the first MROSS vessel would enter service with the Royal Fleet Auxiliary in January 2023.

In January 2023, the first vessel  MV Topaz Tangaroa  was acquired and is to enter service as RFA Proteus. Conversion work will be carried out at Cammell Laird's facility in Birkenhead, England.

Characteristics
The first MROSS vessel, RFA Proteus, is a ready-built commercial vessel which has undergone conversion, whilst the second vessel will be purpose-built in the UK. As such, the two vessels are likely to have different designs and characteristics. 

Proteus was built in Norway in 2019 and will be equipped to operate autonomous submersibles. She has diesel-electric propulsion with powerful twin bow thrusters to "hold a precise stationary position when working over subsea installations". She is also equipped with a moon pool, permitting a sheltered way for robot submersibles to be launched or recovered in high sea states. The ship is 98.1 metres-long with a flight deck, heavy duty crane and 1,000 square meters of cargo space. She has a displacement of 6,000 tonnes and will be crewed by around two dozen RFA sailors and up to 60 Royal Navy specialists.

Whilst both ships will be primarily tasked with survey duties and the protection of the UK's undersea cables and energy supplies, they will also be capable of supporting other defence tasks, such as exercises and operations in the Arctic.

References

Proposed ships of the Royal Navy
United Kingdom defence procurement
Auxiliary research ship classes